The Principle of Doubt is the third album by the German progressive / thrash metal band Mekong Delta, released in 1989. The album is loosely based on Stephen R. Donaldson's dark fantasy trilogy, The Chronicles of Thomas Covenant, the Unbeliever.

Track listing
All music composed by Ralph Hubert, except where indicated. Lyrics by Mekong Delta. Arrangements for group and orchestra of track 6 by Mekong Delta, arrangements for drum and bass of track 9 by Michael and Hubert.

 "A Question of Trust (Cyberpunk 1)" - 3:27
 "The Principle of Doubt (Chapter 3 Taken from the 'Chronicle of Doubt')" - 4:48
 "Once I Believed (Chapter 1 Taken from the 'Chronicle of Doubt')"  - 4:30
 "Ever Since Time Began" - 4:25
 "Curse of Reality (Chapter 14 Taken from the 'Chronicle of Doubt')"  - 4:28
 "Twilight Zone ('Lord Fouls Hort', Chapter 8 Taken from the 'Chronicle of Doubt')" (Marius Constant) - 3:29 (theme from The Twilight Zone)
 "Shades of Doom (Cyberpunk 2)" - 4:05
 "The Jester" - 5:52
 "El Colibrí" (Julio Sagreras) - 1:16
 "No Friend of Mine" - 3:47

Personnel

Band members
Wolfgang Borgmann (as "Keil") — vocals
Uwe Baltrusch (as "Mark Kaye") — guitars, backing vocals
Frank Fricke (as "Rolf Stein") — guitars
Ralph Hubert (as "Björn Eklund") — bass guitar, acoustic guitar, producer
Jörg Michael (as "Gordon 'The Machine' Perkins") — drums

Additional musicians
Stu Phillips - orchestral variations composer

Production
Jörg Stegert  - engineer
Joachim Luetke — cover art

References 

1990 albums
Mekong Delta (band) albums